Nathaniel "Nate" Antwon Harris (born March 8, 1983 in Miami, Florida) is a former American football linebacker. He was signed by the Kansas City Chiefs as an undrafted free agent in 2007. He played college football at Louisville.

Harris was waived by Kansas City at the end of the 2007 and did not play in the 2008 season.

Harris has also been a member of the New York Jets in 2009, and was later waived.

In 2014, Harris was charged with a string of armed robberies of Louisville hotels and a dry cleaner.

References

External links
Kansas City Chiefs bio
Louisville Cardinals bio

1983 births
Living people
Players of American football from Miami
American football linebackers
Louisville Cardinals football players
Kansas City Chiefs players
New York Jets players